Regina Jäger (born 1 November 1960) is a German former swimmer. She competed in two events at the 1976 Summer Olympics.

References

External links
 

1960 births
Living people
German female swimmers
Olympic swimmers of East Germany
Swimmers at the 1976 Summer Olympics
People from Dessau-Roßlau
Sportspeople from Saxony-Anhalt